Chersiphron (fl. 6th century BC), an architect of Knossos in ancient Crete, was the builder of the Temple of Artemis at Ephesus, on the Ionian coast. The original temple was destroyed in the 7th century BC, and about 550 BC Chersiphron and his son Metagenes began a new temple, the Artemision, which became one of the Seven Wonders of the Ancient World in each of its three manifestations.  It was burned by Herostratus in July 356 BC and rebuilt again.

The architect's name is recalled in Vitruvius, and in a passage of Pliny as "Ctesiphon", perhaps in confusion with the great Parthian city of the same name on the river Tigris.

References

Notes

Citations

External links
 William Smith, Dictionary of Greek and Roman Biography and Mythology, 1870: "Chersiphron"

Ancient Greek architects
Ancient Cretan architects
6th-century BC Greek people
Ancient Knossians
Ephesus
6th-century BC architects